Eupithecia corroborata is a moth in the family Geometridae. It is found in Russia (the South Siberian Mountains and the West Siberian Plain) and Kazakhstan.

References

Moths described in 1908
corroborata
Moths of Asia